The first season of That '70s Show, an American television series, began August 23, 1998, and ended on July 26, 1999. It aired on Fox. The region 1 DVD was released on October 26, 2004. The season is set between 1976 and 1977. The first twelve episodes and the 23rd episode were set in 1976, then the series transitioned to 1977 for the remainder of the season.

Cast

Main
Topher Grace as Eric Forman
Mila Kunis as Jackie Burkhart
Ashton Kutcher as Michael Kelso
Danny Masterson as Steven Hyde
Laura Prepon as Donna Pinciotti
Wilmer Valderrama as Fez
Debra Jo Rupp as Kitty Forman
Kurtwood Smith as Red Forman
Tanya Roberts as Midge Pinciotti
Don Stark as Bob Pinciotti

Special guest
Danny Bonaduce as Ricky
Marion Ross as Bernice Forman
Joseph Gordon-Levitt as Buddy
Ernie Ladd as Manager
Gary Owens as Announcer
Katey Sagal as Edna Hyde
Gloria Gaynor as Mrs. Clark

Recurring
Paul Kreppel as Jack Burkhart
Lisa Robin Kelly as Laurie Forman

Guest
Eve Plumb as Mrs. Burkhart
Kevin Farley as Matthew Erdman
Nick Bakay as Gus
The Rock as Rocky Johnson
Ken Shamrock as Wrestler #1
Jeff Hardy (uncredited) as Wrestler #2
Matt Hardy (uncredited) as Wrestler #3
Terry Turner (uncredited) as Announcer
Jennifer Lyons as Pam Macy
Grey DeLisle as Ms. Kaminsky
Paul Connor as Timmy Thompson
Carolyn Hennesy as Sharon Singer
Carlos Alazraqui as Man 
Mitch Pileggi as Bull
Arlene Pileggi as Joy

Episodes

Notes

References 

 That '70s Show Episode Guide at The New York Times, archived from the original

External links 

 
 

1998 American television seasons
1999 American television seasons
Television series set in 1976
Television series set in 1977
1